Events in the year 1945 in Belgium.

Incumbents
 Monarch: Leopold III, with Prince Charles as regent.
 Prime Minister: Hubert Pierlot (until 12 February), Achille Van Acker (starting 12 February)

Events
January
 1 January 
 Operation Bodenplatte is launched. 
 The Chenogne massacre is committed. 
 2–5 January – The Battle of Bure is fought.
 11 January – Socialists leave the government.
 16 January – Wildcat strike in the Port of Antwerp over payment of danger money.
 25 January – The Battle of the Bulge ends.

February
 4 February – Liberation of Belgium complete.
 7 February – Hubert Pierlot's government resigns.
 12 February – Achille Van Acker heads government of national unity.

March
 20 March – Financial agreement signed between National Bank of Belgium and Bank of France.

April
 29 April – General Federation of Belgian Labour founded.

May
 6 May – Central office of the Belgian Socialist Party publicly opposes the return of Leopold III.
 12 May – The Prime Minister and Prince Regent meet with the king to discuss his return.
 14 May – Anti-monarchist rioting in Liège.

June
 9 June – Committees for collective bargaining established.
 14 June – King communicates to the Prime Minister that his health now allows him to return to Belgium.
 15 June – Yser Tower dynamited.
 16 June – Prime Minister proffers his resignation over the issue of the Royal Question.

July
 15 July – Government resumes its activities after the Prince Regent declined to accept the Prime Minister's resignation.
 30 July – National Labour Congress demands 20 per cent pay increases, 8 paid days off each year, and family assistance.

August
 2 August – Catholic Party removed from government of national unity in reshuffle.
 17 August – Forty Belgians among those liberated from the Japanese-run Weixian Internment Camp in northern China.
 18 August – Opening of the founding conference of the Christian Social Party.

September
 19 September
 About 200,000 collaborators deprived of their civil and political rights.
 National Theatre of Belgium founded under the influence of Herman Teirlinck.
 30 September – Leopold III publicly declares that he will accept whatever the decision of the people will be on his return.

October
 21 October – Walloon Congress calls for regional autonomy in the Belgian state.

November
 6 November – Government publishes a white paper on the Royal Question.

December
 27 December – Belgian membership of United Nations ratified.
 28 December – Belgavox begins producing cinema newsreels.

Publications
 Charles Verlinden, Les Empereurs Belges de Constantinople (Brussels, Charles Dessart)

Art and architecture
July
 3 July – Art association Jeune peinture belge established in Brussels, with Willy Anthoons, René Barbaix, Gaston Bertrand, Anne Bonnet, Jan Cox, Jack Godderis, Emile Mahy, Marc Mendelson, Charles Pry, Mig Quinet, Rik Slabbinck and Louis Van Lint among the founding members.

Births
 1 March - Wilfried Van Moer, footballer (died 2021)
 6 April - Léon Dolmans, footballer
 29 May - Daniel Van Ryckeghem, road bicycle racer (died 2008)
 12 June - Henri Xhonneux, film director (died 1995)
 19 August – Jacques De Decker, writer (died 2020)
 20 September - Nicolas Dewalque, footballer
 22 September - Ann Christy (singer) (died 1984)
 25 September - Frans Janssens, footballer
 6 October - Luc Sanders, footballer
 16 November - Jan Bucquoy, anarchist

Deaths
 1 January – Émile Fairon (born 1875), archivist
 10 January – August Vermeylen, art historian
 11 April – Kamiel Van Baelen, novelist, in Dachau concentration camp
 30 May – Roger Libbrecht, last of the thirteen colonels who headed the Secret Army
 23 August – Princess Stéphanie of Belgium
 14 December – Victor de Laveleye, liberal politician, newsreader on the BBC's wartime Radio Belgique
 27 December – Georges Hulin de Loo, art historian
 30 December – Jules Pappaert, footballer

References

 
1940s in Belgium